Dichagyris juldussi is a moth of the family Noctuidae. It is found in western China, western Tibet and Turkestan.

There is one generation per year.

References

External links
 Photo
 Taxonomy

juldussi
Moths described in 1882
Fauna of Tibet
Moths of Asia